KBS Drama Special is a South Korean anthology series created and broadcast by KBS2, with each episode having a different story, cast, director and scriptwriter. The format is based on its predecessor Drama City and MBC's Best Theater.

Drama City ended its run in 2008 after 14 years. Since then, television series adapted from comic books or online novels have been rising to mainstream, leaving even less space for short series to make a comeback. However, on May 15, 2010, KBS Drama Special was introduced in the form of a single-episode anthology series, starting with "Red Candy" by veteran scriptwriter Noh Hee-kyung.

For the 2020 and 2021 editions, Monster Union, the drama production subsidiary of KBS, has been producing Drama Special.

In 2021, KBS introduced a film project 'TV Cinema' in Drama Special. It will be aired first time in October and have 10 works, including four 90-minute TV cinemas and six 70-minute single-act plays.

In 2022, starting with the theatrical release of two films, eight single-act films, a total of 10 films, are released in November and December. All of these are produced by Ascendio Entertainment for KBS.

Series overview

Episodes

Season 1 (2010)

Season 2 (2011)

Season 3 (2012)

Season 4 (2013)

Season 5 (2014)

Season 6 (2015)

Season 7 (2016)

Season 8 (2017)

Season 9 (2018)

Season 10 (2019)

Season 11 (2020)

Season 12 (2021)

Season 13 (2022)

Awards and nominations

KBS Drama Awards

Other awards

See also
 Drama City
 Drama Special Series
 Drama Stage

Notes

References

External links
  
 
 
 
 KBS Drama Special 2022 at Naver 

Korean Broadcasting System television dramas
Korean-language television shows
South Korean anthology television series